Pago Aylés is a branch of Finca Aylés, a Spanish winery in Aragón, Spain. The Pago Aylés branch uses the Vino de Pago wine appellation, a classification for Spanish wine applied to individual vineyards or wine estates, unlike the Denominación de Origen Protegida (DOP) or Denominación de Origen Calificada (DOCa) which is applied to an entire wine region. The Pago Aylés winery was formed as a Vino de Pago in 2003, and geographically it lies within the extent of the Cariñena DOP. Along with the Vino de Pago appellation, the winery sells wines under the Cariñena DOP appellation as Bodega Aylés Demba wines.

References

External links

 Pago Aylés official website

Wine regions of Spain
Spanish wine
Appellations
Wine classification